The United Arab Emirates competed at the 2012 Summer Paralympics in London. The UAE was represented by 15 competitors.

Medallists

Athletics 

Men’s Track and Road Events

Men’s Field Events

Women’s Field Events

Powerlifting 

Men

Shooting

See also
United Arab Emirates at the 2012 Summer Olympics

References

Nations at the 2012 Summer Paralympics
2012
Paralympics